Anthony McGuinness (born 6 May 1964 in Adelaide, South Australia) is a former Australian rules football player who played for Footscray and  in the VFL/AFL. His wife is former Nine News Adelaide presenter Georgina McGuinness.

SANFL career
McGuinness proved his skills early in his career with leading SANFL club Glenelg, winning the Magarey Medal in 1982 at the age of 18. A dynamic and pacy left-footed rover, he featured strongly in Glenelg's 1985 premiership victory against North Adelaide, kicking 2 goals.

VFL/AFL Career
Like his Glenelg premiership teammate Stephen Kernahan, McGuinness then accepted the invitation to play in the more lucrative Victorian Football League. He was signed by Footscray and quickly justified his huge reputation. In five seasons at the Bulldogs, McGuinness missed only one game and consistently racked up many possessions, usually distributing it with precision by hand or by his trusty left foot. He stood out in an otherwise mediocre team, especially in wet weather, and won the club best and fairest award in 1987.

After a particularly fine 1990 season, in which he was a key member of the Bulldogs' revival, McGuinness decided to return to South Australia in 1991 to play with the newly formed Adelaide Crows. McGuinness was Vice-Captain of the Crows for that game with former Glenelg teammate Chris McDermott taking over as captain. He would remain the Crows' vice-captain from 1991 until 1994.

In 1993, Adelaide made the finals for the first time, only to lose to eventual premiers Essendon in a famous Preliminary Final. Adelaide led The Bombers by 42 points at half-time but Essendon came back to win their way into the 1993 AFL Grand Final against  by 11 points. McGuinness had an outstanding season, racking up 657 disposals (477 kicks, 180 handballs, the highest disposal count in his 11-year AFL career), and was recognized with his third All-Australian selection. After finishing 2nd in both 1991 and 1992, McGuinness won the Crows Club Champion award as Adelaide's best and fairest player in 1993.

He became captain for the 1995 and 1996 seasons but along with a number of other older and experienced players, he was delisted at end of the 1996 season by newly appointed Crows coach Malcolm Blight, ending his AFL playing career.

In May 1996, Tony McGuinness and long time Glenelg, South Australian and Crows teammate Chris McDermott set up the McGuinness McDermott Foundation which was launched in memory of five-year-old Nicholas Berry, and seven-year-old Nathan Maclean who died of cancer. The Foundation raises funds to improve oncology treatment for South Australian children.

VFL / AFL Career Statistics Summary
 Statistics are correct as of the end of 2010

Post-retirement
McGuinness returned to his original club Glenelg as a coach from 1998 to 2000, but had little success, finishing 9th, 4th, and 9th respectively. With the Tigers decimated by injuries in 1998 McGuinness came out of retirement for a game at the age of 34.

Subsequently, he commenced as an assistant coach at Port Adelaide Power AFL side in 2005. He resigned from this position at the end of the 2006 season, citing outside business interests and wanting to spend more time with his family.

McGuinness resigned from the McGuinness-McDermott Foundation on 17 August 2010. He also ran a sports retail business, Rowe and Jarman, which he sold to Amart Sports in 2006.

References

External links 
 
 
 SANFL Hall of Fame

Australian rules footballers from Adelaide
Glenelg Football Club players
Western Bulldogs players
South Australian State of Origin players
Adelaide Football Club players
Glenelg Football Club coaches
Malcolm Blight Medal winners
Magarey Medal winners
Charles Sutton Medal winners
All-Australians (1953–1988)
All-Australians (AFL)
South Australian Football Hall of Fame inductees
1964 births
Living people
Australia international rules football team players